Red tag or Red Tag may refer to:

 Red tag, a color-tagged structure classification to represent the severity of damage or the overall condition of a building
 Red tag, an aviation parts tag used in US aviation industry to indicate a part's serviceability
 Red tag, a remove before flight tag or ribbon, used to indicate an aircraft or spacecraft component that must be removed before flight
 Red Tag (artificial fly), a fishing lure used in the sport of fly fishing
 Redtag.ca, a travel website owned by H.I.S.
 Red-tagging in the Philippines,  the malicious blacklisting of Filipino government critics